The Wichita River, part of the Red River watershed, lies in north-central Texas.

The Texan Santa Fe Expedition crossed the river at the site of present-day Wichita Falls in 1841 and found a large Wichita Indian village at the site; the river was later named after the tribe. Today, the largest human settlement on the river is the city of Wichita Falls, which was named after a five-foot waterfall on the river that later washed away in a flood in 1886. The city after nearly 100 years of visitors wanting to visit the non-existent falls built an artificial waterfall beside the river in Lucy Park. They are visible to south-bound traffic on Interstate 44.

The river is dammed in Archer County, forming Lake Diversion, and in Baylor County, forming Lake Kemp; there are also two small reservoirs on the river in Wichita County, one furnishing water for the town of Iowa Park and the other providing water for local irrigation.

The Wichita River has three tributaries; the Wichita proper, as stated above, is formed by the confluence of its North and South Forks. The Middle Fork flows  from north-central King County to its meeting with the North Fork in southwestern Foard County. The South Fork rises in eastern Dickens County and runs for  through King and Knox Counties before joining the North Fork; the King County seat of Guthrie lies on the South Fork.

See also
 Geology of Wichita Falls, Texas
 List of rivers of Texas

References
 "WICHITA RIVER", Handbook of Texas Online, accessed April 12, 2013. Published by the Texas State Historical Association.
 Assessment of Channel Changes, Models of Historical Floods and Effects of Backwater on Flood Stage, and Flood Mitigation Alternatives for the Wichita River at Wichita Falls, Texas United States Geological Survey

Rivers of Texas
Tributaries of the Red River of the South
Rivers of Knox County, Texas
Rivers of Baylor County, Texas
Rivers of Archer County, Texas
Rivers of Wichita County, Texas
Rivers of Clay County, Texas
Rivers of Dickens County, Texas
Rivers of King County, Texas
Rivers of Foard County, Texas